Paradise Space Shuttle is an album by the American jazz saxophonist George Adams recorded in late 1979 and released on the Dutch Timeless label.

Reception
Allmusic awarded the album 3½ stars noting "there's a sense of spontaneity that borders on informality, but Adams is excellent throughout".

Track listing
All compositions by George Adams except as indicated
 "Intentions" - 4:45
 "Send in the Clowns" (Stephen Sondheim) - 4:26
 "Metamorphosis for Mingus" - 6:53
 "Paradise Space Shuttle" - 4:10
 "City of Peace" - 6:46
 "Funk-a-Roonie Peacock" - 14:00

Personnel
George Adams – tenor saxophone
Ron Burton – piano
Don Pate – bass
Al Foster – drums
Azzedin Weston - percussion

References

Timeless Records albums
George Adams (musician) albums
1979 albums